Astro is a Japanese noise group, originally started in 1993 as a solo project of  of the group C.C.C.C. Hiroshi Hasegawa uses assorted analog equipment including vintage Moog and EMS synthesizers. His music covers a wide range of styles in the noise field, from space music to psychedelically-tinged harsh noise. Since 2013, Astro has been a duo of Hiroshi Hasegawa and Rohco (Hiroko Hasegawa), who has played with Astro since 2009.

References

External links
Astro / Hiroshi Hasegawa official home page
ASTRO / C.C.C.C. / Hiroshi Hasegawa at Facebook
Hiroshi Hasegawa/ASTRO/Cosmic Coincidence at umblr

Japanese musical groups
Noise musical groups